Melanohalea subexasperata is a species of foliose lichen in the family Parmeliaceae. Found in China, it was formally described as a new species in 2010 by Fan-Ge Meng and Hai-Ying Wang. It is the only species of Melanohalea with cortical hairs. The lichen is named for its resemblance to Melanohalea exasperata.

References

subexasperata
Lichen species
Lichens described in 2010
Lichens of China